Tennyson Point is a suburb of Sydney, New South Wales, Australia. Tennyson Point is located 10 kilometres west of the Sydney central business district, in the local government area of the City of Ryde and is part of the Northern Sydney region.

Tennyson Point sits on the northern bank of the Parramatta River on a peninsula positioned between Morrisons Bay and Glades Bay. The suburb was originally called Tennyson before it was renamed Tennyson Point by the Geographical Names Board of New South Wales in 2001.

History 
Tennyson Point takes its name from the Tennyson Estate, named
after the poet Alfred Tennyson, which was subdivided in 1887.

Captain William Raven,
(1756-1814) who sailed to New South Wales in 1792 as captain and part owner of the Britannia, was granted 100 acres (40 ha) of land in the area in 1795, plus another 285 acres (115 ha) in 1799. The grant to Raven was known as Grove Farm.  These Eastern Farm properties were managed for him by the brewer James Squire of Kissing Point until 1822.   The tip of the peninsula into the Parramatta River at Tennyson Point is now called Raven Point.  The creek running into Morrisons Bay near the western boundary of Tennyson Point is now called Grove Creek.

In the 1820s all the land of the current suburb was owned by James Squire's daughter Mary Ann Farnell and her husband Thomas Charles Farnell (brewer).
Mary Ann and Thomas were the parents of James Squire Farnell who became the first Australian born premier of New South Wales.

Population 
In the 2016 Census, there were 1,219 people in Tennyson Point. 66.9% of people were born in Australia and 68.8% of people spoke only English at home. The most common responses for religion were Catholic 40.5%, No Religion 19.2% and Anglican 10.9%.

References

External links
  
 1887 Pamphlet showing the subdivision of the Tennyson Estate

Suburbs of Sydney
City of Ryde